Kaplowitz is a surname. Notable people with the surname include:

 Ralph Kaplowitz (1919–2009), American basketball player
 Mike Kaplowitz (born 1959), American lawyer, financial planner and Democratic politician

See also 
 Koplowitz

Jewish surnames
Slavic-language surnames